Malcolm Harris (born 1988) is an American journalist, critic and editor, based in Philadelphia. He is an editor at The New Inquiry and wrote Kids These Days: the Making of Millennials (2017). Harris was involved in the Occupy Wall Street movement.

Life and work 
Harris is an editor at the online magazine The New Inquiry. He lives in Philadelphia.

Harris was "heavily involved" in the Occupy Wall Street movement. In 2012, a court case concerning his ostensible disorderly conduct at an October 2011 Occupy protest on the Brooklyn Bridge became "a significant focus of attention for its involvement of posts to social networking sites and legal arguments over who controls that material."

Harris's 2017 book, Kids These Days: The Making of Millennials, is a social critique of American millennials as human capital. In it, he explores the economic, social, and political conditions and institutions that nurtured American millennials and shaped them into a distinct group. Yohann Koshy wrote in the Financial Times that Harris argues that "society conspires to make life worse for young people", that "millennials are producing lots of value at work that is not reflected in job quality or wages", and that much of this applies to Britain too.

Publications

See also 
 Growing Up Absurd by Paul Goodman

References

External links 
 
 Harris' writing at The New Inquiry
 Harris' writing at Pacific Standard

American critics
21st-century American journalists
21st-century American writers
Occupy Wall Street
Place of birth missing (living people)
Living people
1988 births